Elachista alicanta is a moth of the family Elachistidae. It is found in southern Spain. The habitat consists of xerothermic steppe slopes on calcareous soil.

The forewings are narrow. The ground colour appears mottled grey due to basally greyish white and distally dark grey-tipped scales. The hindwings are grey with a concolorous fringe.

References

alicanta
Moths described in 2005
Moths of Europe